East Grand Lake is located between the U.S. state of Maine and the Canadian province of New Brunswick. The boundary between the United States and Canada passes through the lake. In Maine it falls within two counties, Washington and Aroostook, and in New Brunswick it serves as the western boundary of York County.

The lake is part of the Chiputneticook chain of lakes which also include Spednic, North, and Palfrey and form the headwaters of the St. Croix River. Formerly they were called the Shoodic Lakes.

East Grand Lake is famous for its quality fishing and scenic beauty.

Fishing is very popular on East Grand Lake. The lake is home to several species including landlocked salmon, lake trout, yellow perch, white perch, smallmouth bass, American eel, brook trout, and many more.

See also
List of lakes of New Brunswick

References

External links 
 East Grand Lake

Lakes of New Brunswick
Landforms of York County, New Brunswick
Lakes of Aroostook County, Maine
Lakes of Washington County, Maine
Canada–United States border
International lakes of North America
Lakes of Maine